Kakopathar killings or the Kakopathar massacre took place in Assam during 2006 when the Indian army opened fire at peaceful protesters at Kakopathar in Assam, killing at least 10 people.

They were protesting against the custodial-death of a villager who was arrested by the army. Kakopathar and many areas of rural Upper Assam and Lower Assam is supposedly an ULFA stronghold and the common people have faced army atrocities during counter-insurgency operations since the Assamese Separatist Movement started in 1979. Arabinda Rajkhowa, the chairman of United Liberation Front of Asom compared it with the Jallianwala Bagh massacre.

A strong wave or pro-ULFA sentiments spread across Assam after this incident and many parts of upper Assam saw spontaneous protests of people. The popular sentiments gave strength to a considerably weakened ULFA in Assam.

See also
 Assam Conflict
 Nellie massacre
 Bhimajuli Massacre
 Assamese nationalism
 Assam Agitation

References

External links
 Massacres in Assam by Joylaxmi Saikia Borah on Human Rights Violations in Assam  
 Twenty Cases of Human Rights Violation in Assam in 1997  
 An introduction to Where Peacekeepers Have Declared War, Human Rights Violations in Assam  

Mass murder in 2006
Massacres committed by India